Judith Anne (Judy) Goldsmith is a computer scientist whose publications span a wide range of topics including artificial intelligence, computational complexity theory, decision theory, and computer science education. She is a professor of computer science at the University of Kentucky.

Education and career
Goldsmith graduated from Princeton University in 1982, with a bachelor's degree in mathematics.
She completed her Ph.D. at the University of Wisconsin–Madison in mathematics (with a minor in computer science) in 1988.
Her dissertation, Polynomial Isomorphisms and Near-Testable Sets, was supervised by Deborah Joseph.

After short-term positions as a lecturer at the University of Wisconsin-Madison, research instructor at Dartmouth College, and NSF visiting professor at Boston University, she joined the computer science faculty at the University of Manitoba in 1991. She moved to the University of Kentucky in 1993.

Public opinion
In computer science education, Goldsmith has spoken in favor of using science fiction in preference to case studies for teaching the ethics of artificial intelligence.
She is Jewish, and participates in the Lexington, Kentucky Havurah.
Dr. Goldsmith serves on the board of Sapiens Plurum, which offers annual prizes for short science fiction that envisions options for a better future.

Recognition
Goldsmith won the Mentor Award of the American Association for the Advancement of Sciences in 1997.

Selected publications

References

External links
Home page

Year of birth missing (living people)
Living people
American computer scientists
American women computer scientists
American Jews
Princeton University alumni
University of Wisconsin–Madison College of Letters and Science alumni
University of Wisconsin–Madison faculty
Dartmouth College faculty
Boston University faculty
Academic staff of the University of Manitoba
University of Kentucky faculty
American women academics
21st-century American women